The Temple of Debod is an ancient Egyptian temple that was dismantled as part of the International Campaign to Save the Monuments of Nubia and rebuilt in the center of Madrid, Spain, in Parque de la Montaña, Madrid, a square located Calle de Irún, 21–25 Madrid.

Architecture and artwork

In the early 2nd century BC, Adikhalamani (Tabriqo), the Kushite king of Meroë, started its construction by building a small single-room chapel dedicated to the god Amun. It was built and decorated in a similar design to the later Meroitic chapel on which the Temple of Dakka is based. Later, during the reigns of Ptolemy VI, Ptolemy VIII, and Ptolemy XII of the Ptolemaic dynasty, it was extended on all four sides to form a small temple, which was dedicated to Isis of Philae. The Roman emperors Augustus and Tiberius completed its decorations.

From the quay, there is a long processional way leading to the stone-built enclosure wall, through three stone pylon gateways, and finally to the temple itself. The pronaos, which had four columns with composite capitals, collapsed in 1868 and is now lost. Behind it lay the original sanctuary of Amun, the offering table room and a later sanctuary with several side-rooms and stairs to the roof.

Relocation

In 1960, due to the construction of the Aswan High Dam and the consequent threat posed by its reservoir to numerous monuments and archeological sites, UNESCO made an international call to save this rich historical legacy. As a sign of gratitude for the help provided by Spain in saving the Abu Simbel temples, the Egyptian state donated the Temple of Debod to Spain in 1968.

The temple was rebuilt in one of Madrid's parks, the Parque del Oeste, near the Royal Palace of Madrid, and opened to the public in 1972. The reassembled gateways have been placed in a different order than when originally erected. Compared to a photo of the original site, the gateway topped by a serpent-flanked sun was not the closest gateway to the temple proper. It constitutes one of the few works of ancient Egyptian architecture that can be seen outside Egypt and the only one of its kind in Spain.

Following remarks made by several Egyptologists criticising the fact that unlike other donated temples, the structure continues to be exposed to the elements, the Madrilenian city council made a unanimous decision to accelerate plans to finally cover the monument in February 2020.

See also
 Luxor Temple
The four temples donated to countries assisting the relocation are:
 Temple of Debod (Madrid, Spain)
 Temple of Dendur (Metropolitan Museum of Art, New York, United States)
 Temple of Taffeh  (Rijksmuseum van Oudheden in Leiden, the Netherlands)
 Temple of Ellesyia (Museo Egizio, Turin, Italy)

References

Further reading

 Jambrina, C. (2000) «El viaje del templo de Debod a España». Historia 16, 286.
 Jaramago, M. (1986) «Dioses leones en el templo de Debod». Revista de Arqueología, 65
 Jaramago, M. (1988) «El templo de Debod: factores de degradación». Revista de Arqueología, 88
 Jaramago. M. (1991) «¿Un Mammisi en el templo de Debod?». Boletín de la Asociación Española de Egiptología, 3: 183-187
 Jaramago. M. (1994) «Sobre el origen ramésida del santuario de Amón en Debod». Estudios de Prehistoria y Arqueología Madrileñas, 9: 153-154
 Jaramago, M. (1998) «El templo de Debod. Bosquejo histórico de un "monumento madrileño"». Historia 16, 265
 Jaramago, M. (1998) «El templo de Debod: recientes investigaciones». En: Egipto, 200 años de investigación arqueológica. Ed. Zugarto.
 Jaramago, M. (2004) «La capilla de Adikhalamani en Debod: una interpretación política». Boletín de la Asociación Española de Orientalistas, 40: 123-133 
 Jaramago, M. (2008) «El templo de Debod, una muerte agónica». Muy Historia, 15 (enero de 2008), p. 85.

 Molinero Polo, M.A. y Martín Flores, A. (2007) «Le naos de Ptolémée XII pour Amon de Debod». En: Goyon, J.-C. y Cardin, Ch. (eds.) Proceedings of the Ninth International Congress of Egyptologists. Orientalia Lovanensia Analecta, 150(2): 1311-1325
 Priego, C. y Martin, A. (1992) Templo de Debod. Madrid: Ayuntamiento de Madrid. 67 págs.
 Real Academia de la Historia. (2007) «Declaración de Bien de Interés Cultural del Templo de Debod (Madrid)». En: Informes oficiales aprobados por la Real Academia de la Historia. Boletín de la RAH, 204(2): 137–138.
 Series of pictures of the temple of Debod taken in 1911.

External links

  
 Debod Temple: Official Virtual tour
 19th century travellers' descriptions and prints of the Debod temple
 Vídeo: Templo de Debod. Joya de Egipto en Madrid (Canal UNED)

Religious buildings and structures completed in 1972
Museums in Madrid
Buildings and structures in Casa de Campo neighborhood, Madrid
Debod
Temple of Debod
International Campaign to Save the Monuments of Nubia
Bien de Interés Cultural landmarks in Madrid
History museums in Spain
2nd-century BC religious buildings and structures
2nd-century BC establishments
20th-century religious buildings and structures in Egypt